Heavy Phyo also Heavy Phyoe is a Burmese child actor and singer. He started his career as a child actor when he was two years old. He became well known for advertisements, including Java Coffee and Laser toothpaste.

He was nominated three times for the Myanmar Motion Picture Academy Awards at 2009, 2013 and 2015. He is best known for his performance in the film, Zaw Ka Ka Nay The, Satan's Dancer and I'm Rose, Darling.

Selected filmography

Zaw Ka Ka Nay The (ဇော်က ကနေသည်) (2009)
Satan's Dancer (စေတန်ရဲ့ကချေသည်) (2013)
I'm Rose, Darling (ကျွန်မကနှင်းဆီပါမောင်) (2015)

Awards and nominations

References 

Living people
Year of birth missing (living people)
21st-century Burmese male actors
21st-century Burmese male singers